Songs for Beginners is the debut solo studio album by English singer-songwriter Graham Nash. Released in May 1971, it was one of four high-profile albums (all charting within the top fifteen) released by each member of Crosby, Stills, Nash & Young in the wake of their chart-topping Déjà Vu album of 1970, along with After the Gold Rush (Neil Young, September 1970), Stephen Stills (Stephen Stills, November 1970) and If I Could Only Remember My Name (David Crosby, February 1971). Songs for Beginners peaked at No. 15 on the Billboard Top Pop Albums chart, and the single "Chicago" made it to No. 35 on the Billboard Hot 100. It has been certified a gold record by the RIAA.

History
Nash brought in an impressive group of guests to assist in the recording, including David Crosby, Jerry Garcia, Phil Lesh, Dave Mason, David Lindley, Rita Coolidge, and Neil Young (under Young's early 1970s pseudonym Joe Yankee). The making of this album directly followed Nash's break-up with longtime girlfriend, Joni Mitchell. Many of the songs are about their time together. The Top 40 track "Chicago" concerned both the 1968 Democratic National Convention and the trial of the Chicago Eight, articulating the outrage Nash felt concerning those proceedings.

"Wounded Bird" was written for Stephen Stills, about the pains he was going through in his relationship with Judy Collins. "Better Days", was also written for Stills, after Rita Coolidge left him for Nash.

A first generation compact disc was released in the late 1980s, and reissued in 2011. A remixed version supervised by Nash was issued on 180-gram vinyl only by Classic Records in 2001. A deluxe edition of Songs for Beginners was released on 23 September 2008 as a CD+DVD-Audio pack, featuring a bonus multichannel high resolution audio, all new 2008 video interview with Graham Nash, plus a photo gallery and complete lyrics along with the 11-track CD album remastered.

The song "Simple Man" featured in the opening sequence of the 2007 film Reign Over Me, and a copy of the album appears in it. The same song was also used in the final minutes of the series finale of the HBO series Looking. The song "Better Days" appears in episode 2 of Fox TV's The Passage, released in 2019. A demo version of "Be Yourself" plays during the closing credits of the film Up in the Air. "Military Madness" has been covered live by Death Cab For Cutie, and was covered by indie-rock band Woods on their 2009 album Songs of Shame.

In 2018, the song "Better Days" was used as the closing credit song in the Showtime miniseries Escape at Dannemora, Episode 7. In 2021, "Better Days" was played over the closing credits of the HBO Max series Hacks, Episode 6.

Track listing

Personnel
 Graham Nash — vocals; guitar all tracks except "Better Days" and "Simple Man"; piano on "Better Days", "Simple Man", "Chicago" and "We Can Change the World"; organ on "Better Days", "There's Only One", "Chicago" and "We Can Change the World"; paper and comb on "Sleep Song"; tambourine on "Chicago" and "We Can Change the World"
 Rita Coolidge — piano on "Be Yourself" and "There's Only One"; electric piano on "Be Yourself"; backing vocals on "Military Madness", "Better Days", "Simple Man", "There's Only One", "Chicago" and "We Can Change the World"
 Jerry Garcia — pedal steel guitar on "I Used to Be a King" and "Man in the Mirror"
 Neil Young — piano on "Better Days", "Man in the Mirror" and "I Used to Be a King"
 Dorian Rudnytsky — cello on "Simple Man" and "Sleep Song"
 Dave Mason — electric guitar on "Military Madness"
 David Crosby — electric guitar on "I Used to Be a King"
 Joel Bernstein — piano on "Military Madness"
 Bobby Keys — saxophone on "There's Only One"
 David Lindley — fiddle on "Simple Man"
 Sermon Posthumas — bass clarinet on "Better Days"
 Chris Ethridge — bass on "Man in the Mirror", "There's Only One", "Chicago" and "We Can Change the World"
 Calvin "Fuzzy" Samuels — bass on "Military Madness", "Better Days" and "Be Yourself"
 Phil Lesh — bass on "I Used to Be a King"
 John Barbata — drums on "Military Madness", "I Used to Be a King", "Be Yourself", "Man in the Mirror", "There's Only One", "Chicago" and "We Can Change the World"; tambourine on "Chicago"
 Dallas Taylor — drums on "Better Days"
 P.P. Arnold — backing vocals on "Military Madness"
 Venetta Fields, Sherlie Matthews, Clydie King, Dorothy Morrison — backing vocals on "There's Only One", "Chicago" and "We Can Change the World"

Production personnel
 Graham Nash – producer
 Bill Halverson, Russ Gary, Larry Cox — recording engineers
 Glyn Johns – Mixing
 Doug Sax – mastering
 Gary Burden — art direction
 Joel Bernstein, Graham Nash – photography

Charts

Singles

Certification

References

1971 debut albums
Atlantic Records albums
Graham Nash albums
Albums produced by Graham Nash